Kelli Butler is an American politician and a former Democratic member of the Arizona House of Representatives elected to represent District 28 in 2016, until 2023. She is a member of the Maricopa County Community College District Governing Board. She is also the owner and office manager at Butler Family Dental.

Elections
 2016 – With incumbents Kate Brophy McGee and Eric Meyer both running for the state senate, Butler was unopposed in the open District 28 Democratic Primary. Butler and Republican Maria Syms defeated Republican Mary Hamway in the general election.
 2014 – Butler was unopposed in the Democratic primary for district 28 Senate, and lost to incumbent Adam Driggs in the general election.

References

External links
 Biography at Ballotpedia
 Vote Smart

Women state legislators in Arizona
Democratic Party members of the Arizona House of Representatives
Living people
Politicians from Scottsdale, Arizona
People from Paradise Valley, Arizona
University of Arizona alumni
Year of birth missing (living people)
21st-century American politicians
21st-century American women politicians